The 21st Australian Film Institute Awards ceremony, presented by the Australian Film Institute (AFI), honored the best Australian feature films of 1979.

Winners and nominees

References

External links
 The Australian Academy of Cinema and Television Arts official website

AACTA Awards ceremonies
AACTA Awards
AACTA Awards